"Losing My Religion" is a song by R.E.M.

Losing My Religion may also refer to:

Literature 
 Losing My Religion (novel), a 2014 novel by Vishwas Mudagal
 Losing My Religion: Unbelief in Australia, a 2009 book by Tom Frame
 "Losing My Religion", a 2017 essay by Eric T. Hansen

Music 
 Losing My Religion (album), a 2015 album by Kirk Franklin
 "Losing My Religion", a song by Lauren Daigle from Look Up Child

Television episodes 
 "Losing My Religion" (Grey's Anatomy)
 "Losing My Religion" (Home Improvement)
 "Losing My Religion" (The Looming Tower)
 "Losing My Religion" (Moving On)
 "Losing My Religion" (Out of Order)